Madi Rural Municipality may refer to:

 Madi Rural Municipality, Kaski, a rural municipality in Nepal
 Madi Rural Municipality, Rolpa, a rural municipality in Nepal

See also
Madi (disambiguation)